Clawson is a city in Oakland County in the U.S. state of Michigan. It is part of the Detroit metropolitan area. At the 2010 census, its population was 11,825.

History
This area was occupied by the historic Potowatomi people, who were among the indigenous peoples in the Detroit territory. They traded furs for goods for years with the French Canadians and English colonists.

The city's name is a misspelling of the surname of John Lawson, an early European-American settler. It was founded by European Americans in 1829 and was originally known as Pumachug and The Corners. The name was inspired by the sound made by the Cider Mill and Saw Mill on each corner of the main intersection. The sound was described as "pum-a-chug, pum-a-chug." The city was incorporated as Clawson in 1921 as a village; in 1940 it was incorporated as a city.

Geography

Demographics

2010 census
At the 2010 census, there were 11,825 people, 5,460 households and 2,992 families living in the city. The racial makeup was 93.4% White, 1.9% African American, 0.3% Native American, 2.0% Asian, 0.4% from other races, and 1.9% from two or more races. Hispanic or Latino of any race were 2.1% of the population.

There were 5,460 households, of which 23.5% had children under the age of 18 living with them, 41.8% were married couples living together, 8.9% had a female householder with no husband present, 4.1% had a male householder with no wife present, and 45.2% were non-families. 38.2% of all households were made up of individuals, and 11.8% had someone living alone who was 65 years of age or older. The average household size was 2.14 and the average family size was 2.88.

The median age was 39.9 years. 17.9% of residents were under the age of 18; 7.6% were between the ages of 18 and 24; 31.4% were from 25 to 44; 28.4% were from 45 to 64; and 14.8% were 65 years of age or older. The sex makeup was 49.0% male and 51.0% female.

2000 census
At the 2000 census, there were 12,732 people, 5,572 households and 3,259 families living in the city. The racial makeup was 96.10% White, 0.80% African American, 0.34% Native American, 1.32% Asian, 0.25% from other races, and 1.19% from two or more races. Hispanic and Latino of any race were 1.14% of the population.

There were 5,572 households, of which 25.1% had children under the age of 18 living with them, 46.8% were married couples living together, 8.9% had a female householder with no husband present, and 41.5% were non-families. 35.2% of all households were made up of individuals, and 12.5% had someone living alone who was 65 years of age or older. The average household size was 2.26 and the average family size was 2.98.

20.6% of the population were under the age of 18, 7.5% from 18 to 24, 34.8% from 25 to 44, 21.9% from 45 to 64, and 15.2% who were 65 years of age or older. The median age was 38 years. For every 100 females, there were 94.0 males. For every 100 females age 18 and over, there were 89.5 males.

The median household income was $50,929 and the median family income was $64,684. Males had a median income of $45,242 and females $30,679. The per capita income was $25,676. About 1.4% of families and 3.5% of the population were below the poverty line, including 1.6% of those under age 18 and 4.8% of those age 65 or over.

Government
Clawson utilizes the Council-Manager form of government, and thus is governed by a City Council consisting of a Mayor and four council members. The city council appoints a City Manager, who manages the day-to-day operations of the city.

Clawson is represented in the State House of Representatives by Padma Kuppa, in the State Senate by Mallory McMorrow, in the US Congress 9th Congressional District by Andy Levin, and in the US Congress 11th Congressional District by Haley Stevens.

Education
The city of Clawson is entirely within the boundaries of Clawson Public Schools.

Japhet School, a private school, is located in a former YWCA building in Clawson. It moved there in August 2013 from its previous location in Madison Heights.

Notable people
 Mark Campbell,  tight end for the New Orleans Saints
 Tim Gleason, defenseman for the Toronto Maple Leafs; 2010 Olympian, ice hockey
 Jon Jansen, offensive tackle for the Washington Redskins
 David Robert Mitchell (born 1974), American film director
 Dan Scanlon, director at Pixar Animation Studios
 Lou Cotton, Musician We Came As Romans
 Eric Lehr, contestant on American Idol.

References

External links

City of Clawson official website

Cities in Oakland County, Michigan
Metro Detroit
Populated places established in 1921
1921 establishments in Michigan